The Dota 2 tournament for the 2019 Southeast Asian Games were held on December 5 to 8 at the Filoil Flying V Centre in San Juan, Metro Manila.

Participating teams
Eight teams from eight nations participated at the Dota 2 tournament of the 2019 Southeast Asian Games.

Results

Group stage

Group A

Source:One Esport

Group B

Source:One Esport

Final round
All playoff games including the Bronze Medal Match were a  series, except for the Gold Medal Match which was a  series.

Lower Bracket
Semifinals

Finals – Bronze medal

Upper Bracket
Finals

Gold medal

References

Dota 2
Dota competitions